Bordeaux Mountain ( is located on the island of Saint John, U.S. Virgin Islands within Virgin Islands National Park. Bordeaux Mountain is the highest summit on the island of Saint John.

References

Mountains of the United States Virgin Islands
Virgin Islands National Park
Landforms of Saint John, U.S. Virgin Islands